The 1988 All-Ireland Senior Hurling Championship Final was the 101st All-Ireland Final and the culmination of the 1988 All-Ireland Senior Hurling Championship, an inter-county hurling tournament for the top teams in Ireland. The match was held at Croke Park, Dublin, on 4 September 1988, between Galway and Tipperary. The Munster champions lost to the Connacht men on a score line of 1-15 to 0-14.

Match details

References

External links
Match Programme Cover
Full Match Coverage

All-Ireland Senior Hurling Championship Final
All-Ireland Senior Hurling Championship Final, 1988
All-Ireland Senior Hurling Championship Final
All-Ireland Senior Hurling Championship Finals
Galway GAA matches
Tipperary GAA matches